Sątoczno may refer to the following villages in Poland:
Sątoczno, Pomeranian Voivodeship
Sątoczno, Warmian-Masurian Voivodeship